Marc Julian Bradley (born February 11, 1981) is an American politician and businessman.  A Republican, he represents the 28th district of the Wisconsin State Senate.  The 28th district comprises southwestern suburbs of Milwaukee and the city of Milwaukee, including Franklin, Greenfield, Greendale, and Hales Corners, as well as the towns and villages of southeastern Waukesha County, part of the town of East Troy, and the village and town of Waterford.  He is the first black Republican to serve in the Wisconsin Senate and only the second black Republican to serve in the Wisconsin Legislature.

Early life and career
Julian Bradley was born in Baltimore, Maryland, and moved with his mother to La Crosse, Wisconsin, in 1992, when he was 11 years old.  He was interested in politics from an early age.  Upon graduating from La Crosse Central High School in 1999, with his mother in failing health and finding himself unable to afford college, he leaned on his other childhood passion—for professional wrestling—and enrolled in "wrestling school" in Philadelphia, intending to earn money to support his family.  He made his professional wrestling debut August 28, 1999, under the pseudonym Kris Krude.

After several years living in Philadelphia he entered Temple University, but only remained in school for one year.  In 2007 he left professional wrestling behind and returned to Wisconsin to complete his bachelor's degree at the University of Wisconsin–La Crosse.  While attending UW–La Crosse, he began working as an area repair supervisor for telecommunications company CenturyLink.  He graduated with a degree in political science and economics in 2014 and worked his way up to manager at CenturyLink by 2017.  In 2019 he was hired as a manager at Northwestern Mutual, requiring him to relocate to Franklin, Wisconsin, in Milwaukee County.

Political career
In 2002, after a conversation with his mother over the subject of abortion, Bradley came to the conclusion that he was a Republican.  His campaign website and press releases acknowledged this as a pivotal moment in his life.

He made his first attempt at elected office in 2010 when he ran for Wisconsin State Assembly in the 95th assembly district, but was defeated in the Republican primary.  Despite his primary defeat, he continued working as an organizer and volunteer with the Republican Party of Wisconsin through the general election and became acquainted with Bill Feehan.  Feehan planned to seek election as chairman of the La Crosse County Republican Party in 2011 and asked Bradley to join his ticket as vice chair.  Bradley agreed and they were elected together.  Less than a year later, Feehan stepped down to run for State Senate and Bradley was chosen as his successor.  Bradley was chairman of the La Crosse County Republican Party from 2011 through 2014, when he stepped down to make another attempt at elected office.  In 2013, he was elected vice chair of the state Republican Party for the 3rd congressional district and was ex officio a member of the state party's executive committee.  Also in 2013, he was named Charlie Sykes's Right Wisconsin grassroots activist of the year.

In 2014 he made another run for elected office when he launched a challenge against 32-year incumbent Wisconsin Secretary of State Doug La Follette.  This time he prevailed in the Republican primary, but he fell 86,000 votes short of Doug La Follette in the general election in a year when Republicans won every other statewide office.

Following his move to Franklin in 2019, Bradley resumed his political activities and, in 2020, he announced he would be a candidate to replace State Senator Dave Craig, who was not seeking re-election.  Four other candidates ultimately also joined the Republican primary contest for the safely-Republican senate seat, but Bradley distinguished himself with strong endorsements from established Republicans in the state party, including two of the three assemblymembers whose districts were contained within the boundaries of the 28th senate district—Ken Skowronski and Chuck Wichgers—as well as former Republican governor Scott Walker.  Bradley prevailed with 40% of the vote in the crowded five-person Republican primary.  He went on to defeat Democrat Adam Murphy in the general election, taking nearly 60% of the vote.

Controversies 
In July 2020, while running in the Republican primary for Wisconsin State Senate, the conservative opinion newspaper RightWisconsin alleged that Bradley and his campaign lied when he said that the online publication refused to publish an op-ed that he had submitted.  Rather, the newspaper stated, they had suggested corrections to the Bradley op-ed, as they do with every op-ed that they publish.  The original Bradley article made claims and assertions such as:

"It's no coincidence that Planned Parenthood surgical clinics continue to be located primarily in overwhelmingly black neighborhoods."
"Sincere black lives matter allies should eliminate the Sanger shrine to racism embodied in every Planned Parenthood today."

When RightWisconsin offered corrections and substitutions for these largely speculative and unfounded claims and assertions, the Bradley campaign rejected the newspaper's suggestions, later falsely claiming that RightWisconsin rejected the op-ed outright.

Personal life and family
Julian Bradley is the youngest of three children.  He lives in Franklin, Milwaukee County, Wisconsin.

Electoral history

Wisconsin Assembly (2010)

| colspan="6" style="text-align:center;background-color: #e9e9e9;"| Republican Primary, September 14, 2010

Wisconsin Secretary of State (2014)

| colspan="6" style="text-align:center;background-color: #e9e9e9;"| Republican Primary, August 12, 2014

| colspan="6" style="text-align:center;background-color: #e9e9e9;"| General Election, November 4, 2014

Wisconsin Senate (2020)

| colspan="6" style="text-align:center;background-color: #e9e9e9;"| Republican Primary, August 11, 2020

| colspan="6" style="text-align:center;background-color: #e9e9e9;"| General Election, November 3, 2020

References

External links
 
 
 Campaign website
 28th Senate District (2011–2021)
 Kris Krude at Cagematch Internet Wrestling Database

Living people
1981 births
Politicians from La Crosse, Wisconsin
Republican Party Wisconsin state senators
21st-century American politicians
University of Wisconsin–La Crosse alumni
African-American state legislators in Wisconsin
Professional wrestlers from Wisconsin
La Crosse Central High School alumni
21st-century African-American politicians
20th-century African-American people